Gamble Glacier is a glacier flowing northwest from Chapman Snowfield, and located between Green Nunatak at the southwest and Keating Massif at the northeast, in the Churchill Mountains of Antarctica. It was named in honor of John A. Gamble, a geological scientist at the Victoria University of Wellington. He spent five field seasons (during 1984–93) in Antarctica working on mantle and crustal xenolith studies to understand the nature of the West Antarctic lithosphere. He has worked in Marie Byrd Land, including the West Antarctica Volcano Expedition (1989–92), and on the volcanoes in McMurdo Sound.

References

Glaciers of the Ross Dependency
Shackleton Coast